A post van may be:
A postal delivery vehicle, see Mail truck
A railway car for carrying mail, known as a travelling post office in the UK or a railway post office in the US
Brake Post Office stowage van
Post Office sorting van
Post Office stowage van